Amina Orfi (born 29 June 2007 in Cairo) is an Egyptian professional squash player. As of January 2023, she was ranked number 92 in the world. She is the winner of the World Junior Championships 2022 which was held in Nancy, France. She has four British Junior Open titles as well.

References

2007 births
Living people
Egyptian female squash players